The Dallas Open, also known by its sponsored name Paine Webber Classic, is a defunct, ATP Tour affiliated men's tennis tournament. It was held for one year in Dallas, Texas from September 12 to September 18, 1983, and was played on outdoor hard courts. It was the successor to the Denver Open which was cancelled after the 1982 edition due to a loss of sponsorship. Initially the replacement tournament was planned in Atlantic City but this was later changed to Dallas. Notable players included Jimmy Connors, John Fitzgerald, John Alexander, Andrés Gómez, Brian Teacher, Nduka Odizor, Sherwood Stewart, and Steve Denton.

Finals

Singles

Doubles

References

External links
 ITF tournament profile

Defunct tennis tournaments in the United States
Dallas Open
Grand Prix tennis circuit
Dallas Open
Tennis tournaments in Texas
Sports in Dallas